Harpesaurus brooksi is a species of lizard in the family Agamidae. The species is endemic to Sumatra.

Etymology
The specific name, brooksi, is in honor of British metallurgical chemist Cecil Joslin Brooks, who collected natural history specimens in Borneo and Sumatra.

Description
H. brooksi has a single cylindrical "horn" on its nose.

Reproduction
H. brooksi is oviparous.

References

Further reading
Parker HW (1924). "Description of a new Agamid Lizard from Sumatra". Annals and Magazine of Natural History, Ninth Series 14: 624–625. (Thaumatorhynchus brooksi, new species).

Harpesaurus
Reptiles described in 1924
Taxa named by Hampton Wildman Parker